Lesson No.1 or Lesson 1 or Lesson One may refer to:

 Lesson 1, a music mix by Double Dee and Steinski
Lesson 1, a 2013 album by E-girls
Lesson 1 (Red Warriors album), 1986
Lesson One: Misanthropy!, an album by Death in June
Lesson No. 1, a 1980 Glenn Branca EP
Lesson No.1, a 2006 sampler album by Imperial Recordings
"Lesson One", a 1962 single by Russ Conway 
"Lesson No.1", a song by Viva Voce from The Heat Can Melt Your Brain
"Lesson #1", a song by Anthony Rapp from Look Around